Swansea St Thomas railway station served the city of Swansea, West Glamorgan, Wales from 1860 to the 1960s on the Swansea Vale Railway.

History 
The station was opened to passengers in 1860 by the Swansea Vale Railway. The line was taken over by the Midland Railway in 1876. The station closed to passengers on 25 September 1950 and closed completely in the 1960s. The site was demolished thereafter and the trackbed and site is now part of New Cut Road (A483) and (A4067) where the two roads meet. A small play area is present and this is the site of the station.

References

External links 

Disused railway stations in Swansea
Former Midland Railway stations
Railway stations in Great Britain opened in 1860
Railway stations in Great Britain closed in 1950
1860 establishments in Wales